Timothy Clarke (died 1672) was an English physician.

Timothy or Tim Clarke may also refer to:

Timothy Clarke (businessman), British businessman
Tim Clarke (Australian footballer) (born 1982), former Australian rules footballer 
Tim Clarke (English footballer) (born 1968), English former footballer

See also
 Tim Clark (disambiguation)